Sullivan Township is a township in Grant County, Kansas, USA.  As of the 2000 census, its population was 353.

Geography
According to the USGS, it contains two cemeteries: Golden and Zionville.

The streams of North Fork Cimarron River and Sand Arroyo Creek run through this township.

References
 USGS Geographic Names Information System (GNIS)

External links
 US-Counties.com
 City-Data.com

Townships in Grant County, Kansas
Townships in Kansas